This is a listing of notable people who were born in, or have lived in, Tucson, Arizona. For people whose only connection with the city is attending the University of Arizona, see: List of University of Arizona people. Coaches of University of Arizona athletic teams should not be included either.

Athletics

 George Arias – professional baseball player
 Dave Baldwin – major league baseball player, writer, artist
 Michael Bates – athlete
 Chad Beyer – professional cyclist
 Craig Bjornson – baseball coach
 Alex Bowman – NASCAR driver
 Bryce Cotton – professional basketball player
 Dominick Cruz – mixed martial artist
 Ike Davis – professional baseball player
 Chris Duncan – baseball player
 Shelley Duncan – baseball player
 Sean Elliott – professional basketball player
 Cole Ford – professional football player
 Jim Grabb – former professional tennis player ranked world # 1 in doubles
 Chelsi Guillen – pairs figure skater
 J. J. Hardy – baseball player
 Ron Hassey – baseball player
 Gary Hayes – professional football player
 Alex Kellner – born in Tucson, baseball player
 Walt Kellner – born in Tucson, baseball player
 Mike Kellogg – professional football player
Ian Kinsler (born 1982), Israeli-American Major League Baseball 4x All Star second baseman
 Chris Knierim – pairs figure skater
Hank Leiber – professional baseball pitcher
 Eddie Leon – born in Tucson, baseball player
 Lafayette Lever – professional basketball player, attended Pueblo High School
 Caitlin Leverenz – Olympic swimmer, born in Tucson, attended Sahuaro High School
 Pete McCaffrey  – basketball player
 Roger McCluskey – National Sprint Car Hall of Fame racer
 Alice Greenough Orr – rodeo star, originally from Montana
 Tom Pagnozzi – professional baseball pitcher
 Allen Pitts – professional Canadian Football League player
 Sam Sacksen – 2008 Beijing Olympic modern pentathlete
 Anthony Shumaker – baseball player
 Michael Smith – NFL running back
 Brad Steinke – Emmy award-winning sportscaster
 Kerri Strug – Olympic gold-medalist gymnast
 Alex Verdugo — Baseball outfielder for Boston Red Sox, attended Sahuaro High School
 Win Young – Olympic medalist in diving

Business

 Leopoldo Carrillo – Mexican-American entrepreneur, early founder of Tucson
 Arturo Moreno – entrepreneur, owner of Los Angeles Angels of Anaheim
 Jeff Rein – chairman and chief executive officer of Walgreens
 Margaret Sanger – Planned Parenthood founder
 Robert Sarver – entrepreneur, principal owner of Phoenix Suns

Law and order

 Clay Pell  lawyer
 Eugene O'Dunne – jurist on the Supreme Bench of Baltimore

Literature

 Edward Abbey – author
 Sue Alexander – children's author
 Jon Anderson – poet
 Byrd Baylor – essayist and children's author
 Michael Blake – author
 Charles Bowden – author
 Ray Bradbury – author
 Erskine Caldwell – playwright
 Max Cannon – author and creator of the comic strip Red Meat
 Mitch Cullin – author
 Charles G. Finney – author
 Frances Gillmor, folklorist, scholar, and novelist
 Andrew Greeley  – author, scholar and Roman Catholic priest
 Barbara Kingsolver – novelist
 Joseph Wood Krutch – author
 Todd Miller – journalist
 Tom Miller – travel writer
 Gary Paul Nabhan — author and ethnobotanist
 Adam Rex – children's writer and illustrator 
 Stacey Richter – author
 Richard Shelton – poet, author
 Leslie Marmon Silko – author
 Susan Sontag – author, filmmaker
 Luci Tapahonso – poet laureate of the Navajo Nation
 David Foster Wallace – author
 Peter Wild – poet, author, and Professor of English at the University of Arizona
 Ofelia Zepeda – poet laureate of Tucson, author
 Tom Zoellner – nonfiction author

Movies, television, and media

 Tommy Shannon -Musician Stevie Ray Vaughan and Double Trouble
 Rex Allen – actor, musician
 Hailey Baldwin – model
 Mika Boorem – actress
 Lynn Borden – actress and 1957 Miss Arizona
 Roy Brown – actor 
 Brooke Burke – model, TV host
 Aaron Chang – photographer
 Kaylee DeFer – actress
 Barbara Eden – actress
 Pablo Francisco – stand-up comedian
 Savannah Guthrie – television personality
 Dan Hicks – sportscaster
 Michael Horse – actor, jeweler, painter
 Pat Hughes – baseball announcer
 Dominic Janes – actor
 Ben Patrick Johnson – journalist, model, voice-over artist
 Brad Johnson – actor, former Marlboro Man
 Daniel Kennedy – actor
 Gavin MacIntosh – child/teen actor, model
 Taryn Manning – actress 
 Lee Marvin – Academy Award-winning actor
 Bentley Mitchum - actor
 Noel Neill – actress
 Sierra Teller Ornelas – filmmaker and screenwriter
 Larry Pine – actor 
 Timothy Reckart – Oscar-nominated filmmaker
 Garry Shandling – comedian and actor
 W. Eugene Smith – photographer
 Frederick Sommer – photographer
 Martin Spanjers – actor
 Sally Todd – model, actress
 Janet Varney – actress
 Kate Walsh – actress
 Lou Waters – newscaster
 Parker Young – model, actor

Music, arts

Panteha Abareshi – multidisciplinary visual artist
 Madeline Heineman Berger – music and arts promoter
 Duane Bryers – painter, illustrator and sculptor
 Joey Burns – musician
 Joseph Byrd – musician
 Luis Coronel – singer, musician
 John Convertino – musician
 James Pringle Cook – Western landscape painter
 Jason DeCorse – musician, member of Greyhound Soul
 Ted DeGrazia – artist
 John Denver – singer, musician
 Daniel Martin Diaz – artist and musician
 Marianne Dissard – singer, writer, filmmaker
 Maynard Dixon – artist
 Duane Eddy – musician, member of the Rock and Roll Hall of Fame
 Howe Gelb – musician
 Greg Ginn – musician, founder of Black Flag and SST Records
 Lalo Guerrero – father of Chicano music
 Ulysses Kay – composer
 Katie Lee – folk singer, writer, photographer
 Bob Log III – musician
 Arizona Muse – model
 Dennis F. Parker – musician, recording engineer
 Raymond Pettibon – artist
 Signe Pierce (born 1988) – multidisciplinary artist
 Rainer Ptacek  – composer, musician
 Linda Ronstadt – singer
 Barry Sadler – singer-songwriter
 Pat The Bunny Schneeweis – folk-punk artist
 Mark Wystrach – musician

Politics

 Alma Hernandez - Member of the Arizona House of Representatives
Dean Burch – Republican National Committee chairman, 1964–1965; chairman, FCC
 J. W. Buchanan - Arizona state senator, member of the Arizona House of Representatives
 James B. Burkholder – peace activist and retired U.S. Army officer
 Richard Carmona – U.S. Surgeon General
 Tony Carrillo – Arizona state legislator
 James N. Corbett – former Mayor of Tucson 
 Dennis DeConcini – U.S. Senator
 Gabby Giffords – former U.S. Representative 
 Raul Grijalva – U.S. Representative
 Don Hummel – politician, former Tucson mayor, businessman
 Kyrsten Sinema – U.S. Senator
 Robert C. Strong – U.S. diplomat
 Mark Udall – U.S. Senator from Colorado, former member of the House
 Mo Udall – Congressman
 Stewart Udall – politician, U.S. Secretary of Interior
 Tom Udall – U.S. Senator from New Mexico

Science and medicine

 David Arnett – astronomer
 Bart Bok – astronomer
 Frank Borman – astronaut, orbited the Moon on Apollo 8
 A. E. Douglass – astronomer, dendrochronologist
 Tom Gehrels – planetary scientist
 Emil Haury – archaeologist
 Rashad Khalifa – biochemist and founder of United Submitters International
 Gerard Kuiper – planetary scientist
 William Rathje – archaeologist, Garbage Project director
 Peter M. Rhee – physician 
 Elizabeth Roemer – astronomer
 Peter Smith – scientist, principal investigator of Phoenix Project
 Andrew Weil – doctor who promotes integrative medicine
 Wieslaw Z. Wisniewski – astronomer

Military

 Thad Allen – U.S. Coast Guard admiral
 Frank L. Culin Jr. – United States Army major general
 José de Urrea – Mexican general

Crime

 Robert John Bardo – convicted murderer and stalker of model Rebecca Schaeffer
 Jared Lee Loughner – convicted mass murderer who perpetrated the 2011 Tucson shooting
 Joseph Bonanno – mobster
 Stephen Paddock – mass shooter who perpetrated the 2017 Las Vegas shooting
 Charles Schmid – killer

Religion

 William M. Branham – minister
 Eusebio Kino – pioneer missionary and explorer

Miscellaneous 

 María Urquides – educator, "Mother of Bilingual Education"

References

 
Tucson, Arizona
Tucson